Morgan Township is one of the fourteen townships of Morgan County, Ohio, United States.  The 2000 census found 2,617 people in the township, 941 of whom lived in the unincorporated portions of the township.

Geography
Located in the central part of the county, it borders the following townships:
Bloom Township - north
Bristol Township - northeast
Meigsville Township - east
Windsor Township - southeast
Malta Township - west

Much of Morgan Township is occupied by McConnelsville, the county seat and largest village of Morgan County.

Name and history
It is one of six Morgan Townships statewide.

Government
The township is governed by a three-member board of trustees, who are elected in November of odd-numbered years to a four-year term beginning on the following January 1. Two are elected in the year after the presidential election and one is elected in the year before it. There is also an elected township fiscal officer, who serves a four-year term beginning on April 1 of the year after the election, which is held in November of the year before the presidential election. Vacancies in the fiscal officership or on the board of trustees are filled by the remaining trustees.

References

External links
County website

Townships in Morgan County, Ohio
Townships in Ohio